The following is a list of communities that no longer exist or former Villages/Towns that have become unincorporated hamlets in the province of Saskatchewan, Canada.

Ghost towns are towns that once had a considerable population, that have since dwindled in numbers causing some or all its business to close, either due to the rerouting of a highway, train tracks being pulled, or exhaustion of a natural resource. One of the more famous stories of Saskatchewan ghost towns arose around Uranium City which was close to achieving city status and utterly collapsed upon the closure of the Eldorado mine and the mass exodus of its population.

Initially travel began by horse and wagon or ox and cart along trails which generally followed animal trails across the North-West Territories. Railways would not build across the western frontier without settlement as it would be too costly to provide train service across a barren wilderness. The Clifford Sifton immigration policy encouraged settlers to arrive. Western settlement began and immigration encroached across the Manitoba border into the North-West Territories later to become the Province of Saskatchewan in 1905. As travel evolved to automobiles, there was no longer a need for centres this close together. In the 1940s when the highway became more popular, and the rail branch lines started to close down, saw the demise of sidings and villages located on the rail line but not on the highway. In the late 1950s and 1960s when highways were straightened and developed from gravel to asphalt and oil surface highways many of the bypassed towns and villages folded. Businesses set up shop in towns on the new straightened highway, and children could be bused to composite schools in the larger centres. The following placenames may exist only as commemorative road names which intersect the current highways and have disappeared altogether or they may be unincorporated areas of the Rural Municipality|RM such as Floral, the birthplace of Gordie Howe. Floral would be currently located off the Yellowhead highway for example but it was on Provincial Highway 5 when the road was on the square. Floral currently is demarked by an old church at the Floral Cemetery, and the Floral one room school is now the community hall for meetings and social gatherings. The only remembrance of Floral is a road named Floral road. The road travelled on the 'square' connecting many small country towns was a different one from the highway of today connecting larger urban centres.

A rural municipality, often abbreviated RM, is a form of municipality consisting of an elected reeve for the elected head along with aldermen or Councillors of a rural municipality, performing a similar role to the mayor of a village, town or city. An RM may have its office in a town or village, which has its own separate and distinct civic administration, but the RM administers the rural affairs of a large land area including unincorporated areas or ghost towns. The RM administers the remaining population of the ghost town providing any needed civic infrastructure, safety, health, educational, or tourism affairs. Localities with small populations are enumerated in census taking by Statistics Canada as a population belonging to the RM. For instance Churchbridge No. 211 includes the localities of Beresina 	and the Melville Airport.

List of ghost towns

See also 

Lists of ghost towns in Canada
List of communities in Saskatchewan

References

External links 
. Canadian Ghost Towns
Ghost towns in Saskatchewan
Saskatchewan ghost towns - our roots nos racines

Saskatchewan
Ghost towns